is a railway station in the city of Kashiwazaki, Niigata, Japan, operated by East Japan Railway Company (JR East). It is also a freight terminal for the Japan Freight Railway Company.

Lines
Kashiwazaki Station is served by both the Shinetsu Main Line and the Echigo Line.

Station layout
The station consists of two island platforms, serving four tracks, connected by a footbridge. The two-story station building has a Midori no Madoguchi staffed ticket office.

Platforms

History
Kashiwazaki Station opened on 1 August 1897. A new station building was completed in October 1967. With the privatization of Japanese National Railways (JNR) on 1 April 1987, the station came under the control of JR East.

Surrounding area

Kashiwazaki Post Office
Kashiwazaki High School
Headquarter of Bourbon Corporation

Passenger statistics
In fiscal 2017, the station was used by an average of 1,623 passengers daily (boarding passengers only).

See also
 List of railway stations in Japan

References

External links

 JR East station information 

Railway stations in Niigata Prefecture
Railway stations in Japan opened in 1897
Shin'etsu Main Line
Echigo Line
Stations of East Japan Railway Company
Stations of Japan Freight Railway Company
Kashiwazaki, Niigata